Nemanja Trkulja (born 1 January 1996) is a Bosnian-Herzegovinian professional footballer who most recently played as a goalkeeper for Premier League of Bosnia and Herzegovina club Borac Banja Luka.

Club career
He decided to look for other opportunities in January 2020, when his contract with Borac expired.

References

1996 births
Living people
People from Prijedor
Serbs of Bosnia and Herzegovina
Association football goalkeepers
Bosnia and Herzegovina footballers
Bosnia and Herzegovina under-21 international footballers
FK Kozara Gradiška players
FK Borac Banja Luka players
First League of the Republika Srpska players
Premier League of Bosnia and Herzegovina players